Mallan is a locality in the Murray River Council, New South Wales, Australia. It is located approximately 690 km from Sydney and covers an area of some 320 square kilometers.

Heritage listings 
The Coonamit Bridge over Wakool River on Swan Hill Road that connects Mallan with neighbouring Dilpurra is listed on the New South Wales State Heritage Register.

References 

Localities in New South Wales
Murray River Council